Jean Tiberi (born January 30, 1935) is a French politician who was mayor of Paris from May 22, 1995 to March 24, 2001. , he was mayor of the 5th arrondissement of Paris and deputy to the French National Assembly from the second district of Paris.

Of Corsican descent, Tiberi first entered the National Assembly in August 1968 as the replacement for René Capitant, who was appointed to the government as Minister of Justice. He was re-elected in the 1973 election, serving until early 1976, when he was appointed to the government as Secretary of State in charge of Food Industries, under the Minister of Agriculture and the Minister of Industry and Research. He served in that position until August 1976, after which he returned to the National Assembly in a by-election in November 1976 to replace Monique Tisne. He has been re-elected to the National Assembly in every election since then.

He was Mayor of the 5th arrondissement of Paris from March 1983 to May 1995, when he became Mayor of Paris. After serving as Mayor of Paris, he was again elected as Mayor of the 5th arrondissement in 2001.

Jean Tiberi and his wife Xavière Tiberi were involved in corruption scandals in the Paris region in which Mr Tiberi was convicted of vote-rigging and given a ten month suspended prison sentence.

In 1998, a justice-ordered search of Jean and Xavière Tiberi's apartment on the Place du Panthéon showed that they possessed two pistols whose authorization had expired since 1991 and five ammunition boxes. They were not prosecuted in exchange for the destruction of the weapons.

The above actions are sometimes referred to by the press as Corsican mores. 

Along with Jean-Pierre Soisson and Didier Julia, Jean Tiberi was among the longest-serving members of the National Assembly, in which he has served 10 terms and 44 years. He  did not run for  reelection in 2012.

Friend of Jean-Edern Hallier, he has been Cercle InterHallier member since 2019.

Political career
Governmental function

Secretary of State for Food Industries : January–August 1976.

Electoral mandates

National Assembly of France

Member of the National Assembly of France for Paris : 1968–1976 (Became Secretary of State in 1976) / And since November 1976. Elected in 1968, reelected in 1973, 1976, 1978, 1981, 1986, 1988, 1993, 1997, 2002, 2007.

Municipal Council

Mayor of Paris : 1995–2001.

Deputy-mayor of Paris : 1983–1995. Reelected in 1989.

Councillor of Paris : Since 1965. Reelected in 1971, 1977, 1983, 1989, 1995, 2001, 2008.

Mayor of the 5th arrondissement of Paris : 1983–1995 / And since 2001. Reelected in 1989, 2001, 2008.

Councillor of the 5th arrondissement of Paris : Since 1983. Reelected in 1989, 1995, 2001, 2008.

References

1935 births
Living people
Lycée Louis-le-Grand alumni
Rally for the Republic politicians
Union for a Popular Movement politicians
Mayors of Paris
Politicians from Paris
French people of Corsican descent
French city councillors
Paris 2 Panthéon-Assas University alumni
Deputies of the 12th National Assembly of the French Fifth Republic
Deputies of the 13th National Assembly of the French Fifth Republic
Mayors of arrondissements of Paris